Xenoconger is a genus of eels in the family Chlopsidae (false morays). It contains the single species Xenoconger fryeri, or Fryer's false moray. This species was described by Charles Tate Regan in 1912. It is a tropical, marine eel which is known solely from Assumption Island, in the Indian Ocean. The collector was John Claud Fortescue Fryer.

References

Eels
Chlopsidae
Monotypic fish genera